The Ruđer Bošković Institute (RBI; , , IRB) is a research institute located in the Šalata neighborhood of Zagreb, Croatia, founded in 1950, which studies the sciences.

Description
It is the largest Croatian research institute in the fields of the natural sciences and technology. The name of the institute, which honours the scientist Ruđer Bošković, was put forth by one of its founders, physicist Ivan Supek.

The institute has a multidisciplinary character: it employs approximately 550 academics and students from the fields of experimental and theoretical physics, chemistry and materials physics, organic and physical chemistry, biochemistry, molecular biology and medicine, environmental and marine research and computer science and electronics.

Within Croatia, RBI is a national institution dedicated to research, higher education and provision of support to the academic community, to state and local governments and to technology-based industry. Within the European Union, RBI forms a part of the European Research Area. Worldwide, RBI collaborates with many research institutions and universities upholding the same values and vision.

Approximately 75% of the institute's funding is provided by the Government of Croatia, through the Ministry of Science, Education and Sports.

Divisions
The institute is organized into 14 research divisions and centers:
 Division of Theoretical Physics
 Division of Experimental Physics
 Division of Materials Physics
 Division of Electronics
 Division of Physical Chemistry
 Division of Organic Chemistry and Biochemistry
 Division of Materials Chemistry
 Division of Molecular Biology
 Division of Molecular Medicine
 Center for Marine Research
 Division for Marine and Environmental Research
 Division of Laser and Atomic Research and Development
 NMR Centre
 Centre for Informatics and Computing

See also
 Institute of elementary education in Serbia Belgrade https://osboskovic.edu.rs/

Notes

Sources

External links
  

1950 establishments in Yugoslavia
Research institutes established in 1950
Research institutes in Croatia
Multidisciplinary research institutes
Gornji Grad–Medveščak